Jane Dunbar Chaplin ( – ) was an American novelist and abolitionist.   

The family emigrated to New York City in 1821. In 1841 she married Jeremiah Chaplin, a Baptist minister and son of Rev. Jeremiah Chaplin the first president of Colby College.   

Many of Chaplin's works were religiously-oriented works for children, published by the American Tract Society.  Her 1853 novel The Convent and the Manse, published under the pseudonym "Hyla", was an anti-Catholic novel which purported (like numerous similar fictional works at the time) to expose the misdeeds of Catholic nuns.  Her Gems of the Bog: A Tale of Irish Peasantry (1869) traces the lives of the Sheenan family through various trails until their emigration to America.  Abolitionism was a feature of several of Chaplin's works.  Her Black and white; Or, the heart, not the face (1863) was a "pseudo slave narrative" about a fictional woman named Juno Washington.  Her Out of the Wilderness (1870) follows African-Americans Zeke and Weza as they migrate to New England.  With her husband, she wrote a biography of abolitionist Charles Sumner, published in 1874. 

Jane Dunbar Chaplin died on 17 April 1884 in Boston.

Partial bibliography 

 The Convent and the Manse (John P. Jewett, 1853) as "Hyla"
 Songs for my children (American Tract Society, 1861)
 Fire-Light Stories (American Tract Society, 1862)
 Black and white; Or, the heart, not the face (American Tract Society, 1863)
 Gems of the Bog: A Tale of Irish Peasantry (1869)
 Out of the Wilderness (H.A. Young & Co., 1870)
 The Life of Charles Sumner (D. Lothrop & co, 1874) with Jeremiah Chaplin

References

External links
  Books by Chaplin

Created via preloaddraft
1819 births
1884 deaths
American women novelists
19th-century American novelists
19th-century American women writers
American abolitionists
Scottish emigrants to the United States